The 23rd Gran Premio di Roma (Rome Grand Prix), was Round Five of the 1981 European Championship for F2 Drivers. This was held at the Autodromo Vallelunga Piero Taruffi, to the north of Rome, on 10 May.

Report

Entry
A total of 32 F2 cars were entered for the event, of which 27 took part in qualifying.

Qualifying
Eje Elgh took pole position for the Maurer Motorsport, in their Maurer-BMW MM81, averaging a speed of 105.59 mph.

Race
The race was held over 65 laps of the Vallelunga circuit. Eje Elgh took the winner spoils for Maurer Motorsport outfit, driving their Maurer-BMW MM81. Elgh won in a time of 1 h 16 min 1.14 s, averaging a speed of 102.01 mph. Second place went to another Swede, Stefan Johansson in the Docking Spitzley Team Toleman’s Lola-Hart T850. The podium was completed by the work March driver, Thierry Boutsen, in his March-BMW 812.

Classification

Race result

 Fastest lap: Corrado Fabi, 1 min 9.06 s. (103.651 mph)

References

Rome Grand Prix
European Formula Two Championship
Rome Grand Prix